The University of the Philippines - National College of Public Administration and Governance (UP - NCPAG), a degree-granting unit of the University of the Philippines Diliman, is the first school of public administration and public policy in Asia and the top educational institution in the said academic field and practice in the Philippines. It was established in 1952.

The college also serves as headquarters-secretariat of the Eastern Regional Organization for Public Administration (EROPA) and the Association of Schools of Public Administration in the Philippines (ASPAP).

History
UP-NCPAG traces its roots to the Institute of Public Administration (IPA), which was established on June 15, 1952, after the University of the Philippines entered into an agreement with the University of Michigan in the United States to aid the former in providing technical assistance in the field of public administration as part of the Bell Mission's recommendations. For its first four (initially two) years, the IPA was under American leadership.

The IPA was the first of its kind not only in the Philippines, but also in Asia. In its first two years of operations, the IPA had conducted three kinds of courses with the participation of 2,500 government officials and employees. Later, undergraduate and master's degrees in Public Administration were offered. From 68 students in First Semester 1953–1954, enrollment in these academic programs increased to about 200 every semester by 1955.

In 1968, the Doctor of Public Administration program was instituted. The undergraduate program was also phased out that year, only to be restored in 1987. The following year, a diploma program was opened, enabling administrators to pursue specialized courses in public administration without going through the master's degree.

The college changed its name four times. From the IPA, it became the Graduate School of Public Administration, the School of Public Administration, and the College of Public Administration. The current name, the National College of Public Administration and Governance, was approved by the University of the Philippines Board of Regents in its 1126th meeting on November 26, 1998.

In 2004, the Commission on Higher Education of the Philippines officially recognized UP-NCPAG as the most outstanding school of public administration in the country.

Two academic units of the university, the School of Urban and Regional Planning and the Center for
Integrative and Development Studies, trace their roots to UP-NCPAG.

Degree programs
Bachelor of Public Administration
Diploma in Public Management
Master of Public Administration (Thesis and Non-Thesis Tracks)
 Majors:
 Public Policy and Program Administration
 Local and Regional Governance
 Spatial Information Management
 Organizational Management
  Fiscal Administration
 Public Enterprise Management
 Voluntary Sector Management
Doctor of Public Administration

Centers and offices

Center for Public Administration and Governance Education
The Center for Public Administration and Governance Education (CPAGE) is in-charge of the academic programs offered by the college: the Bachelor of Public Administration (BPA), the Master of Public Administration (MPA) and the Doctor of Public Administration (DPA) programs. Its director also serves as the College Secretary and Director of Studies.

NCPAG Library
The NCPAG Library provides bibliographic and information support to the curricular, research and extension programs of the college. It serves primarily the needs of its students, faculty and research staff. Its book collection consists of over 38,000 volumes in the field of public administration and related subject fields. The Library also serves as a supplementary source of materials in the social sciences to students, faculty and researchers of other UP units. It also accommodates government and private researchers, as well as graduate students from other schools, under certain conditions.

Publications Office
Manages the publication of the Philippine Journal of Public Administration (PJPA), one of the longest running academic journals in the country. The Office also publishes books, occasional papers,  monographs, and other teaching and training materials.

Notable alumni
 Heidi Mendoza, Undersecretary General for the United Nations Office of Internal Oversight Services, former Commissioner of the Commission on Audit of the Philippines
 Antonio "Sonny" Trillanes IV, former Philippine Senator (2007-2019)
 Ralph Recto, incumbent Representative of the 6th District of Batangas in the House of Representatives of the Philippines, former Philippine Senator (2001-2007, 2010–2022)
 Ramon Paje, former Secretary of Environment and Natural Resources (2010-2016)
 Benjamin Diokno, incumbent Secretary of Finance, 5th Governor of the Bangko Sentral ng Pilipinas (2019-2022), former Secretary of Budget and Management (1998-2001, 2016–2019)
 Mike Defensor, former Anakalusugan Partylist Representative in the House of Representatives of the Philippines (2019-2022)
 Herbert Bautista, former Mayor of Quezon City (2010-2019)
 Leonor Briones, former Secretary of Education (2016-2022)
 Prospero De Vera III, incumbent Chairperson of the Commission on Higher Education (CHED) 
 Alfred Vargas, former Representative of the 5th District of Quezon City in the House of Representatives of the Philippines (2013-2022)
 Francisco Nemenzo Jr., political scientist and 18th President of the University of the Philippines

References

External links

National College of Public Administration and Governance Official Website
University of the Philippines - Diliman
U.P. National College of Public Administration and Governance at iskWiki
Center for Local and Regional Governance

University of the Philippines College
Public administration schools
Public policy schools
Universities and colleges in Metro Manila
Universities and colleges in Quezon City
Educational institutions established in 1952
Graduate schools in the Philippines
1952 establishments in the Philippines